Minuscule 764 (in the Gregory-Aland numbering), ε1231 (von Soden), is a Greek minuscule manuscript of the New Testament written on parchment. Palaeographically it has been assigned to the 14th century. The manuscript has no complex contents. Scrivener labelled it as 855e.

Description 
The codex contains the text of the four Gospels, on 332 parchment leaves (size ), with some lacunae. The text is written in one column per page, 20-22 lines per page. It lacks texts of Matthew 6:7-7:15; 6:25-9:9; John 21:3-25 were supplied by a later hand on paper.

Text 
The Greek text of the codex is a representative of the Byzantine text-type. Hermann von Soden classified it to the textual family Kx. Aland placed it in Category V.

According to the Claremont Profile Method it represents textual family Kx in Luke 1 and Luke 20. In Luke 10 no profile was made.

History 
Scrivener dated the manuscript to the 12th century; Gregory dated the manuscript to the 14th century. The manuscript is currently dated by the INTF to the 14th century.

In 1598 the manuscript to the monastery Vatopedi at Athos, by Ban Gregorius Kritsiun.

It was added to the list of New Testament manuscripts by Scrivener (855) and Gregory (764). Gregory saw the manuscript in 1886.

The manuscript is now housed at the National Library of Greece (157) in Athens.

See also 

 List of New Testament minuscules
 Biblical manuscript
 Textual criticism
 Minuscule 763 (Gregory-Aland)

References

Further reading 

 

Greek New Testament minuscules
14th-century biblical manuscripts
Manuscripts of the National Library of Greece